Silvio Confortola (13 January 1910 – 29 January 2003) was an Italian cross-country skier who competed in the 1930s.

Biography
He won a bronze medal in the 4 x 10 km at the 1937 FIS Nordic World Ski Championships. He also participated in the 1948 Winter Olympics, where he placed sixth in the 4 x 10 km relay competition and eighteenth in the 50 km event.

At the 1935 Trofeo Mezzalama, together with Aristide Compagnoni and Mario Compagnoni, he finished third. The 1938 Trofeo Mezzalama he won together with brothers
Severino and Aristide Compagnoni.

Further notable results
 1938: 3rd, Italian men's championships of cross-country skiing, 50 km
 1939: 2nd, Italian men's championships of cross-country skiing, 18 km
 1943: 3rd, Italian men's championships of cross-country skiing, 18 km
 1946: 3rd, Italian men's championships of cross-country skiing, 50 km
 1947: 2nd, Italian men's championships of cross-country skiing, 45 km

See also
 Antonella Confortola

References

External links
World Championship results 
Interview with Silvio Confortola 
Silvio Confortola's profile at Sports Reference.com

1910 births
2003 deaths
Italian male cross-country skiers
Italian male ski mountaineers
Olympic cross-country skiers of Italy
Cross-country skiers at the 1948 Winter Olympics
FIS Nordic World Ski Championships medalists in cross-country skiing